Tadhkirah,  Arabic for "memorandum" or "admonition", is frequently used as part of the title of literary works of the nature of authoritative collections or summaries. It may refer to the following works:
al-Tadhkira al-Harawiya fi al-hiyal al-harabiya ("al-Harawi's admonition regarding war stratagems") by Ali ibn abi bakr al-Harawi (d. 1215)
Tazkirat ul Khwas by Sibt ibn al-Jawzi (d. 1256)
Tazkirat al-Awliya (13th century), biographies of Sufi saints
Al-Tadhkirah fi'ilm (13th century) by Nasir al-Din al-Tusi (d. 1274)
 Tadhkirat al-huffaz (14th century), biographies  of hadith masters
Sharh al-tadhkirah (16th century), a commentary on al-Tusi's tadhkirah by Al-Birjandi
a work by Dawud al-Antaki (d. 1599) on medicine, natural history and the occult sciences
Tadhkirat al-Nisyan (c. 1750), a biographical dictionary of the Moroccan rulers of Timbuktu, see Askiya dynasty
 Tazkirat al-umara (1830), a Persian-language work by James Skinner (East India Company officer)
Tazkirah Khandan Azizi  by Hakim Abdul Aziz (d. 1911)
Tadhkirah (Ahmadiyya) (1976), a collection of texts  by Ahmadiyya founder  Mirza Ghulam Ahmad (1873–1908)
Tadhkirat al-Fuqahā (1997), a work on Shiite jurisprudence
Tezkire, Ottoman bibliographical dictionaries of poets and poetry
al-Tadhkira fi 'ilm al-Haya (Memento in Astronomy), A work on the science of astronomy by Nasir al-Din al-Tusi

See also 
Dhikr
Afghan identity card

Arabic words and phrases
Persian literature by genre